Casino da Madeira (Casino of Madeira) is a casino located in Funchal, Madeira, Portugal, which is part of the hotel Pestana Casino Park. It was designed by Brazilian architect Oscar Niemeyer and it opened in 1976.

References

External links
Official website

1976 establishments in Portugal
Casinos in Portugal
Buildings and structures in Funchal
Tourist attractions in Funchal
Casinos completed in 1976